Jamil Ahmad Qasmi is an Indian politician and a member of the 16th Legislative Assembly of Uttar Pradesh of India. He represents the Meerapur constituency of Uttar Pradesh and is a member of the Bahujan Samaj Party political party.

Early life and education
Jamil Ahmad Qasmi was born in the district of Muzaffarnagar, Uttar Pradesh. Qasmi has received education till twelfth grade. Before being elected as MLA, he used to work as an agriculturist.

Political career
Jamil Ahmad Qasmi has been a MLA for one term. He represents the Meerapur constituency.

Posts Held

See also
Meerapur
Uttar Pradesh Legislative Assembly
Government of India
Politics of India
Bahujan Samaj Party

References 

Bahujan Samaj Party politicians from Uttar Pradesh
People from Muzaffarnagar district
1961 births
Living people